Dr Samuel Merritt (1822–1890) was a physician and the 13th mayor of Oakland, California, from 1867–1869. He was a founding Regent of the University of California, 1868-1874. He was also a shipmaster and a very successful businessman; he died at age 68 with a reputation for being the most affluent man in Oakland.

Early years
Samuel Merritt was born in 1822 in Harpswell, Maine, within Casco Bay. As the youngest of five children of Stephen and Joanna (Purington) Merritt, in addition to schooling, he learned some fishing, helped to build ships, and helped in other functions of a mariner. In 1844 he graduated from the Medical School of Maine at Bowdoin College. After practising medicine in Plymouth, Massachusetts, for several years, Dr Merritt decided to join the California gold rush. He borrowed heavily from his brother Isaac, bought a 140-ton brig Reindeer, filled it with general supplies, and embarked on his voyage in 1849 as the navigator.

According to the Port of San Francisco, the brig Reindeer arrived on 5 May 1850, 153 days from New York, with assorted cargo for Merritt. Because of a fire in San Francisco before his arrival, he sold his consignment quickly for a handsome profit. Moreover, he chartered his brig for $800 a month, carrying passengers and cargo to and from Humboldt Bay, which started his trading business. Meanwhile, he continued through the 1850s his medical practice near the San Francisco berths, with his physician's office listed for six years at Room No. 7 in the Express Building at the corner of Montgomery and California Streets. In 1852 he bought land in what is now the city of Oakland and moved there in 1863.

Later years
As mayor of the rapidly growing town of Oakland, Merritt knew that it was crucial to establish the West Coast railhead of the Pacific Railroad in Oakland itself to secure its future economic viability. To achieve this goal, he and his contemporaries resolved complicated and long-standing disputes over tideland ownership through legal maneuvering, negotiated with the railroads, and navigated a series of compromise waterfront arrangements in Spring 1868. As the compromise took place on April 1st, cynics called it an April Fool's Day trick. As Oakland was an across-the-bay suburb of San Francisco, the press dubbed it the "future Jersey City of the Pacific Coast."

In 1867, he donated 155 acres (627,000 m2) of tidal water from the headwaters of Indian Slough to the Bay. As part of his mayoral waterfront compromises in Spring 1868, he orchestrated (and donated $18,000 toward) a public work dam across the San Antonio Slough estuary at 12th Street, turning the tidal lagoon into a lake at the high-tide level, which became known first as "Merritt's Lake" and later as Lake Merritt. Lake Merritt is historically significant as the United States' first official wildlife refuge, designated in 1870 at his urging. It also has been listed as a National Historic Landmark since 1963, and on the National Register of Historic Places since 1966.

In May 1868, Merritt was appointed as a regent by Governor Haight to the founding Board of Regents of the then-nascent University of California. He served as a regent until June 1874.  Merritt resigned from the board after a two-month investigation by the California State Assembly's public building committee which held him responsible for the young university's very first corruption scandal.  The committee concluded that Merritt had profited financially from selling an inferior building to the university at an exorbitant cost, at $24,000 over its reasonable value. Even though the Board of Regents had enacted a resolution against self-dealing in the construction of campus buildings in June 1872, Merritt in his capacity as chair of the regents' building committee had awarded the contract for the construction of the original College of Letters building (North Hall) at the Berkeley campus to his preferred contractor, Power and Ough—who then obtained most of the needed lumber and cement from a lumber company in Oakland owned by Merritt. 

With the sea in his blood, Dr. Merritt launched in 1878 his 72-ton keel schooner yacht, Casco, built under his supervision after a model of his own. Four years later, he launched onto his Lake the first sharpie on the Pacific coast. Robert Louis Stevenson, who chartered Merritt's Casco during the Summer and Fall of 1888, was delighted with the sailing qualities of the schooner yacht in the South Seas. In early August 1890, Merritt paid Sausalito one last visit in his yacht Casco, but he was too weak and had to return to Oakland in a steamer.

Death and legacy
Dr Merritt died in August 1890 at age 68, in his Oakland residence in the block bounded by Madison, Jackson, Fourteenth and Fifteenth streets, with an estate of over $2,000,000 and the reputation of being the most affluent man in Oakland. He was buried in Mountain View Cemetery in Oakland.

His namesake Lake Merritt "stands as the jewel of Oakland, even crowned with lights." 

He left plans for a hospital and nursing school to be built in his name after his death. In 1909, Samuel Merritt University and Merritt Hospital opened.

References

External links
Samuel Merritt from Camron-Stanford House Preservation Association
Lake Merritt from Camron-Stanford House Preservation Association  
Lakeside Park/Lake Merritt from City of Oakland Parks and Recreation

1822 births
1890 deaths
Mayors of Oakland, California
Bowdoin College alumni
Burials at Mountain View Cemetery (Oakland, California)
19th-century American politicians